Hammershus is a Danish roll-on/roll-off passenger (ro-pax) ferry operated by Molslinjen on the Rønne–Køge and Rønne–Sassnitz routes. The vessel was the first ship built by Rauma Marine Constructions and entered service in August 2018.

References 

2018 ships
Ships built in Rauma, Finland
Ferries of Denmark